Kevin Craig Megson (born 1 July 1971) is an English former professional footballer who played as a right back.

Career
Born in Halifax, Megson played for Bradford City, Halifax Town and Stalybridge Celtic. He later captained Ovenden West Riding.

References

1971 births
Living people
English footballers
Bradford City A.F.C. players
Halifax Town A.F.C. players
Stalybridge Celtic F.C. players
English Football League players
Association football fullbacks